Tsentralnaya Usadba 3-go Goskonezavoda is a rural locality (a selo) and the administrative center of Nizhnesavinskoye Rural Settlement, Kuyedinsky District, Perm Krai, Russia. The population was 800 as of 2010. There are 16 streets.

Geography 
It is located 38 km southwest of Kuyeda (the district's administrative centre) by road. Nizhnyaya Sova is the nearest rural locality.

References 

Rural localities in Kuyedinsky District